Compacta is a genus of moths of the family Crambidae. The genus was erected by Hans Georg Amsel in 1956.

Species
Compacta capitalis (Grote, 1881)
Compacta hirtalis (Guenée, 1854)
Compacta hirtaloidalis (Dyar, 1912)
Compacta nigrolinealis (Warren, 1892)

References

Spilomelinae
Crambidae genera
Taxa named by Hans Georg Amsel